Siromi Dokonivalu Turaga is a Fijian lawyer, politician, and cabinet minister. Since 24 December 2022 he has been the Attorney-General of Fiji. He is a member of the People's Alliance.

Turaga was born in Tovulailai on Nairai in the Lomaiviti Islands and educated at AOG Primary School in Kinoya and Central Fijian School in Nausori. After studying in Australia on a Fijian Affairs Board scholarship he attended the University of the South Pacific, where he studied history and politics, and Saint Peter's University in the United States, where he studied political science. He joined the Fijian civil service in 1991 as a cadet in the prime minister's office, and later studied law. Admitted as a lawyer in 1999, he worked for the Attorney-General's office before being appointed a magistrate in 2012. In April 2020 during the COVID-19 pandemic he acquitted two men of breaching a curfew on the grounds that the charge was defective as the Prime Minister had no power to order arrests under the Public Health Act. The ruling was subsequently set aside by the High Court, and in May 2020 his contract as a magistrate was not renewed. He later claimed that he was fired for ruling against the government.

In May 2022 he was announced as a People's Alliance candidate for the 2022 Fijian general election. During the election campaign he said that he supported jailing FijiFirst leaders Frank Bainimarama and Aiyaz Sayed-Khaiyum if there were charges that supported it.

He was elected to the Parliament of Fiji with 2860 votes. On 24 December 2022 he was appointed Attorney-General in the coalition government of Sitiveni Rabuka.

References

Living people
University of the South Pacific alumni
Saint Peter's University alumni
Fijian lawyers
Fijian civil servants
Members of the Parliament of Fiji
People's Alliance (Fiji) politicians
Attorneys-general of Fiji
Year of birth missing (living people)